Pro Arena (formerly TV Sport, Sport.ro and Pro X) is a Romanian TV channel that airs programming intended for a male audience, including sports transmissions. Its headquarters are located in Bucharest and it is owned by Pro TV SRL (Central European Media Enterprises).

On March 7, 2022, it was announced that Pro X will change its name to Pro Arena. The branding effect was on April 4, 2022 at 06:00 EET.

Programming

References

Central European Media Enterprises
Television stations in Romania
Television channels and stations established in 2003
Sports television networks